Donovan James "D. J." Mitchell (born 12 March 1997) is an American professional basketball player for Śląsk Wrocław of the Polish Basketball League. He is also contracted with the Brisbane Bullets of the National Basketball League (NBL). Born in Australia, he grew up in the United States and holds an Irish passport. He played college basketball for the Wake Forest Demon Deacons and Santa Clara Broncos before playing professionally in the Netherlands and Australia.

Early life
Mitchell was born in Melbourne, Victoria, to American parents. His parents met in Australia during the 1990s. His father, Mike, was playing for the North Melbourne Giants in the Australian NBL in 1997.

Mitchell grew up in Fresno, California, and attended Buchanan High School in nearby Clovis, where he was a three-time first-team all-conference honouree with the basketball team. He was an all-state volleyball player at Buchanan.

College career
Mitchell played his first two college basketball seasons for the Wake Forest Demon Deacons. After playing in just four games as a freshman in 2016–17, he appeared in 30 games as a sophomore in 2017–18, averaging 2.9 points and 2.2 rebounds per game.

On 30 April 2018, Mitchell transferred to Santa Clara. He subsequently sat out the 2018–19 season due to NCAA transfer regulations.

As a redshirt junior in 2019–20, Mitchell played in all 33 games for the Broncos with 15 starts. He ranked third on the team in scoring (10.7 ppg) on 49.4 percent field goal shooting and was second on the team in both 3-point shooting (38.3 percent) and rebounding (5.2 pg). On 29 February 2020, he scored a career-high 25 points against Portland.

As a senior in 2020–21, Mitchell played in 18 games for the Broncos, starting five and averaging 6.4 points and 4.1 rebounds per game. On 16 February 2021, he scored a season-high 16 points against Loyola Marymount.

Professional career
Coming out of college, Mitchell turned down an opportunity to play in Uruguay to instead begin his professional career in Ireland playing for Templeogue in the Super League while undertaking a master's degree at Griffith College. However, he left the team prior to making his debut after being lured to the Netherlands.

On 15 October 2021, Mitchell signed with Dutch team BAL of the BNXT League. In 22 games during the 2021–22 season, he averaged 16.0 points, 8.2 rebounds and 2.8 assists per game.

In June 2022, Mitchell moved to Australia and joined the Gold Coast Rollers of the NBL1 North. He helped the Rollers win the 2022 NBL1 North championship. In 14 games, he averaged 18.4 points, 8.6 rebounds, 2.7 assists and 1.8 blocks per game.

Following the NBL1 North season, Mitchell joined the Brisbane Bullets of the Australian NBL for the 2022–23 season. Following the Bullets' 0–4 start to the season, Mitchell was suspended for one game after being asked to leave training after having a difference of opinion with coach James Duncan over his role in the Bullets' offence. On 19 November 2022, he scored 21 points in a 90–82 loss to the Cairns Taipans. For the season, he averaged 9.56 points, 4.56 rebounds and 1.3 assists per game.

Following the NBL season, Mitchell joined Polish team Śląsk Wrocław for the rest of the 2022–23 PLK season.

Mitchell is set to join the Northside Wizards for the 2023 NBL1 North season and then re-join the Bullets for the 2023–24 NBL season.

Personal life
Mitchell is the son of Americans Mike Mitchell and Michelle Maher. His father played professional basketball in Australia and Europe while his mother played professional beach volleyball. His mother has Irish heritage through her grandparents. Through marriage, his father gained an Irish passport and played for Ireland. His parents later separated.

As a result of his Irish heritage, Mitchell also holds an Irish passport. He too is eligible to play for the Irish national team, which was touted as a possibility in 2021.

Mitchell has two siblings, Jaiden and Myca. Myca played volleyball at Wake Forest and Howard.

In 2022, Mitchell played for two of the same teams his father also played for in the NBL, the Gold Coast Rollers and Brisbane Bullets.

References

External links
NBL profile
Wake Forest Demon Deacons college bio
Santa Clara Broncos college bio

1997 births
Living people
American expatriate basketball people in Australia
American expatriate basketball people in Poland
American expatriate basketball people in the Netherlands
American men's basketball players
Australian men's basketball players
Basketball Academie Limburg players
Basketball players from Melbourne
Brisbane Bullets players
Forwards (basketball)
Irish men's basketball players
Santa Clara Broncos men's basketball players
Śląsk Wrocław basketball players
Wake Forest Demon Deacons men's basketball players